Houlihan or O'Houlihan (feminine ) is a surname of Irish Gaelic origin, from the Irish  meaning "proud". Notable people with the surname include:

Adam Houlihan (born 1978), former Australian rules footballer
Christopher Houlihan (born 1987), American concert organist
Con Houlihan (1925–2012), Irish sportswriter
Damian Houlihan (born 1975), former Australian rules footballer
Gerard Houlihan, Irish retired Gaelic footballer
Jim Houlihan (1898–1967), Irish sportsperson
Joan Houlihan, American poet
John C. Houlihan (1910–1986), American politician, the 43rd mayor of Oakland, California
John J. Houlihan (1923–2003), American politician, Illinois state representative
Mike Houlihan (born 1969), retired Irish sportsperson
Pat Houlihan (1929–2006), English snooker player
Patrick Houlihan (1889–1963), Irish politician
Ryan Houlihan (born 1982), Australian rules footballer
Shelby Houlihan (born 1993), American middle-distance runner
Tim Houlihan (born 1989), Australian rules footballer
Timmy Houlihan (born 1982), Irish sportsperson

See also
Houlihan's, an American restaurant and bar chain
Houlihan Lokey, independent, advisory-focused, global investment bank
Houlihan Stadium or Tampa Stadium, a sports venue in Tampa, Florida
Houlihan Smith & Company, investment banking firm
Jim Houlihan Park at Jack Coffey Field, a baseball venue on the Rose Hill campus of Fordham University in Bronx, New York
Cathleen ni Houlihan, one-act play written by Irish playwright William Butler Yeats
Kathleen Ni Houlihan, a mythical symbol and emblem of Irish nationalism found in literature and art
Margaret "Hot Lips" Houlihan, a fictional character in the M*A*S*H franchise
 In cattle roping the houlihan is a one-swing flip shot at a calf traveling in front of you from left to right
Holohan, an alternative spelling
Houlahan
Wes Hoolahan